This is a list in alphabetical order of cricketers who have played for Somerset County Cricket Club in top-class matches from 1882 to 1885 inclusive and then continuously from 1891. Founded in 1875, the club held minor status until 1881 and again from 1886 to 1890. Somerset is classified as an important team by substantial sources from 1882 to 1885 and from 1891 to 1894; classified as an official first-class team from 1895 by Marylebone Cricket Club (MCC) and the County Championship clubs; classified as a List A team since the beginning of limited overs cricket in 1963. and classified as a first-class Twenty20 team since the inauguration of the Twenty20 Cup in 2003. Note that there is disagreement in the sources about the status of certain Somerset matches before 1882.

The details are the player's usual name followed by the years in which he was active as a Somerset player. Seasons given are first and last seasons; the player did not necessarily play in all the intervening seasons. Note that many players represented other top-class teams besides Somerset. Current players are shown as active to the latest season in which they played for the club. The list excludes Second XI and other players who did not play for the club's first team; and players whose first team appearances were in minor matches only. Click on the 'CA' to access the Cricket Archive entry for the player. For List A and Twenty20 players who did not represent Somerset in first-class cricket, see the appropriate sections below.

A 

 Aamer Sohail (2001) 1 match CA
 Abdur Rehman (2012–2015) 13 matches CA
 Tom Abell (2014–2022) 104 matches CA
 Edmund Adams (1935) 1 match CA
 Kasey Aldridge (2021–2022) 9 matches CA
 Charlie Alison (1902–1905) 4 matches CA
 Jim Allenby (2015–2017) 32 matches CA
 Bill Alley (1957–1968) 350 matches CA
 Granny Alston (1933) 1 match CA
 Joe Ambler (1883) 4 matches CA
 Stanley Amor (1908–1930) 26 matches CA
 Gareth Andrew (2003–2005) 11 matches CA
 Bill Andrews (1930–1947) 226 matches CA
 Les Angell (1947–1956) 132 matches CA
 Richard Ashley (1932) 2 matches CA
 Colin Atkinson (1960–1967) 163 matches CA
 Graham Atkinson (1954–1966) 271 matches CA
 Jon Atkinson (1985–1989) 14 matches CA
 Azhar Ali (2018–2021) 20 matches CA

B 

 Babar Azam (2019) 1 match CA
 Abbas Ali Baig (1960–1962) 23 matches CA
 Paul Bail (1985–1986) 7 matches CA
 Alfred Bailey (1900–1911) 40 matches CA
 Cyril Baily (1902) 1 match CA
 Frederick Baitup (1924) 1 match CA
 Prince Bajana (1912–1920) 51 matches CA
 Edward Baker (1921) 1 match CA
 John Baker (1952–1954) 9 matches CA
 William Baldock (1920–1936) 10 matches CA
 Edgar Ball (1914) 3 matches CA
 Cecil Banes-Walker (1914) 5 matches CA
 Omari Banks (2009) 6 matches CA
 Percy Banks (1903–1908) 7 matches CA
 Tom Banton (2018–2022) 28 matches CA
 Charles Barlow (1925–1926) 2 matches CA
 George Barne (1904) 1 match CA
 John Barnwell (1935–1948) 69 matches CA
 Michael Barnwell (1967–1968) 6 matches CA
 Alexander Barrett (1896) 1 match CA
 Alex Barrow (2011–2016) 40 matches CA
 Ezra Bartlett (1894–1895) 6 matches CA
 George Bartlett (2017–2022) 47 matches CA
 Ricky Bartlett (1986–1992) 50 matches CA
 Terry Barwell (1959–1968) 43 matches CA
 Edward Bastard (1883–1885) 15 matches CA
 Michael Bates (2015) 6 matches CA
 Jeremy Batty (1995–1996) 20 matches CA
 David Beal (1991) 3 matches CA
 Leslie Bean (1929) 3 matches CA
 Charles Bennett (1902) 2 matches CA
 Michael Bennett (1928–1939) 109 matches CA
 Charles Bernard (1896–1901) 33 matches CA
 William Berry (1926) 1 match CA
 Dom Bess (2016–2019) 26 matches CA
 Arthur Bezer (1914) 1 match CA
 Ken Biddulph (1955–1961) 91 matches CA
 Paul Bird (1994) 2 matches CA
 Bert Bisgood (1907–1921) 67 matches CA
 Eustace Bisgood (1909) 1 match CA
 Charles Bishop (1920–1921) 2 matches CA
 Ian Bishop (1996) 1 match CA
 Ian Blackwell (2000–2008) 120 matches CA
 Guy Blaikie (1921–1923) 9 matches CA
 Algernon Bligh (1922–1926) 14 matches CA
 Rayner Blitz (1986) 5 matches CA
 Frank Bolus (1893–1894) 10 matches CA
 Stephen Booth (1983–1985) 33 matches CA
 Ian Botham (1974–1986) 172 matches CA
 Nicholas Boulton (1997) 1 match CA
 Gerald Boundy (1926–1930) 2 matches CA
 Alfred Bowerman (1900–1905) 2 matches CA
 Peter Bowler (1995–2004) 160 matches CA
 Charles Bowring (1913) 4 matches CA
 Len Braund (1899–1920) 281 matches CA
 Dennis Breakwell (1973–1983) 165 matches CA
 Jimmy Bridges (1911–1929) 214 matches CA
 Ben Brocklehurst (1952–1954) 64 matches CA
 Dickie Brooks (1968) 26 matches CA
 Jack Brooks (2019–2022) 27 matches CA
 Colin Brown (1902–1905) 8 matches CA
 Leigh Brownlee (1902) 1 match CA
 James Bryant (2003) 14 matches CA
 Eric Bryant (1958–1960) 22 matches CA
 Michael Bryant (1982) 2 matches CA
 Bill Buck (1969) 1 match CA
 Paddy Bucklan (1948) 1 match CA
 John Bucknell (1895–1905) 10 matches CA
 Matthew Bulbeck (1998–2002) 47 matches CA
 William Bunce (1936–1937) 14 matches CA
 Graham Burgess (1966–1979) 252 matches CA
 William Burgess (1921–1922) 7 matches CA
 James Burke (2012) 1 match CA
 Mike Burns (1997–2005) 134 matches CA
 Neil Burns (1987–1993) 150 matches CA
 George Burrington (1901–1902) 3 matches CA
 Humphrey Burrington (1903–1905) 5 matches CA
 George Burrough (1936) 1 match CA
 Dickie Burrough (1927–1947) 171 matches CA
 William Burrough (1906) 4 matches CA
 Bertie Buse (1929–1953) 304 matches CA
 George Butler (1920) 1 match CA
 Cecil Buttle (1926–1928) 2 matches CA
 Jos Buttler (2009–2013) 48 matches CA
 Eddie Byrom (2017–2021) 28 matches CA

C 

 Andrew Caddick (1991–2009) 191 matches CA
 Bill Caesar (1946) 3 matches CA
 John Cameron (1932–1947) 48 matches CA
 Charlie Carter (1968–1969) 26 matches CA
 Tom Cartwright (1970–1976) 101 matches CA
 Box Case (1925–1935) 255 matches CA
 Fred Castle (1946–1949) 23 matches CA
 John Challen (1884–1899) 52 matches CA
 Greg Chappell (1968–1969) 52 matches CA
 Piyush Chawla (2013) 4 matches CA
 Harry Chidgey (1900–1921) 98 matches CA
 Albert Clapp (1885–1895) 10 matches CA
 Bob Clapp (1972–1977) 15 matches CA
 Seymour Clark (1930) 5 matches CA
 Vince Clarke (1994) 2 matches CA
 Tony Clarkson (1966–1971) 104 matches CA
 Geoff Clayton (1965–1967) 89 matches CA
 Matthew Cleal (1988–1989) 15 matches CA
 Brian Close (1971–1977) 142 matches CA
 Terence Cole (1922) 1 match CA
 Edward Collings (1921–1925) 4 matches CA
 Boris Collingwood (1953) 1 match CA
 Edward Compton (1894–1907) 4 matches CA
 Nick Compton (2010–2014) 67 matches CA
 Jack Conibere (1950) 4 matches CA
 Ulick Considine (1919–1935) 89 matches CA
 Devon Conway (2021) 2 matches CA
 Jimmy Cook (1989–1991) 71 matches CA
 William Cookson (1882) 1 match CA
 Robert Coombs (1985–1986) 13 matches CA
 Miles Coope (1947–1949) 70 matches CA
 Richard Cooper (1972) 1 match CA
 Tom Cooper (2015) 14 matches CA
 Andy Cottam (1992–1996) 8 matches CA
 Geof Courtenay (1947) 4 matches CA
 Peter Courtenay (1934) 2 matches CA
 David Cox (1969) 1 match CA
 Jamie Cox (1999–2004) 91 matches CA
 Fred Coyle (1903–1905) 2 matches CA
 Beaumont Cranfield (1897–1908) 125 matches CA
 Lionel Cranfield (1906) 4 matches CA
 Humphrey Critchley-Salmonson (1910–1928) 14 matches CA
 Alfred Crowder (1908) 3 matches CA
 Martin Crowe (1984–1988) 48 matches CA
 Thomas Crump (1885) 1 match CA
 Dan Cullen (2006) 4 matches CA
 Alec Cunningham (1930) 2 matches CA
 John Currie (1953) 1 match CA

D 

 John Daniell (1898–1927) 287 matches CA
 Clive Davey (1953–1955) 13 matches CA
 Josh Davey (2015–2022) 49 matches CA
 Philip Davey (1934–1937) 16 matches CA
 Ryan Davies (2016) 15 matches CA
 Steven Davies (2017–2022) 70 matches CA
 Mark Davis (1982–1987) 77 matches CA
 Ken Day (1950–1956) 7 matches CA
 William Dean (1952) 1 match CA
 Charles Deane (1907–1913) 36 matches CA
 Zander de Bruyn (2008–2010) 46 matches CA
 Marchant de Lange (2021–2022) 13 matches CA
 Peter Denning (1969–1984) 269 matches CA
 David Deshon (1947–1953) 4 matches CA
 Adam Dibble (2011–2015) 4 matches CA
 Tom Dickinson (1957) 5 matches CA
 Mathew Dimond (1994–1997) 5 matches CA
 George Dockrell (2011–2014) 29 matches CA
 Bradleigh Donelan (1994) 1 match CA
 David Doughty (1963–1964) 17 matches CA
 Robert Draper (1925–1929) 3 matches CA
 Colin Dredge (1976–1988) 194 matches CA
 Charles Dunlop (1892–1905) 43 matches CA
 Wes Durston (2002–2009) 34 matches CA
 Keith Dutch (2001–2004) 45 matches CA

E 

 Guy Earle (1922–1931) 152 matches CA
 Michael Earls-Davis (1950) 1 match CA
 Edward Ebdon (1891–1898) 2 matches CA
 John Ebdon (1898) 1 match CA
 Percy Ebdon (1894) 2 matches CA
 Simon Ecclestone (1994–1998) 36 matches CA
 Neil Edwards (2002–2009) 49 matches CA
 Peter Eele (1958–1965) 54 matches CA
 Dean Elgar (2013–2017) 9 matches CA
 Sam Ellis (1902) 1 match CA
 Alfred Evans (1882–1884) 6 matches CA
 David Evans (1894–1902) 15 matches CA
 Ernest Evans (1891) 1 match CA
 David Evans (1953) 8 matches CA
 Nick Evans (1976) 1 match CA
 Percival Ewens (1923–1926) 7 matches CA

F 

 Cuthbert Fairbanks-Smith (1921) 2 matches CA
 Ernest Falck (1935–1936) 4 matches CA
 Harold Fear (1934) 2 matches CA
 Nigel Felton (1982–1988) 108 matches CA
 Simon Ferguson (1985) 1 match CA
 Geoffrey Fletcher (1939) 1 match CA
 Iain Fletcher (1991–1994) 14 matches CA
 Nick Folland (1992–1994) 31 matches CA
 Humphrey Forman (1910) 1 match CA
 Daren Foster (1986–1989) 28 matches CA
 Arnold Fothergill (1882–1884) 16 matches CA
 Gerald Fowler (1891–1903) 119 matches CA
 Bill Fowler (1882–1884) 15 matches CA
 Henry Fox (1882) 3 matches CA
 Herbert Fox (1882–1891) 10 matches CA
 Philip Foy (1919–1930) 21 matches CA
 John Francis (2004–2008) 35 matches CA
 Simon Francis (2002–2006) 40 matches CA
 Thomas Francis (1921–1925) 16 matches CA
 John Frazer (1921) 1 match CA
 Arthur Freeman (1905) 1 match CA
 Philip Fussell (1953–1956) 2 matches CA

G 

 Jim Galley (1969) 3 matches CA
 Herbert Gamlin (1895–1896) 3 matches CA
 Trevor Gard (1976–1989) 112 matches CA
 Joel Garner (1977–1986) 94 matches CA
 Tommy Garnett (1935–1939) 5 matches CA
 Hubert Garrett (1913) 8 matches CA
 Sunil Gavaskar (1980) 15 matches CA
 Leslie Gay (1894) 4 matches CA
 Carl Gazzard (2002–2009) 28 matches CA
 Roy Genders (1949) 2 matches CA
 Ronald Gerrard (1935) 3 matches CA
 Arthur Gibbs (1919–1920) 3 matches CA
 Joseph Gibbs (1891–1894) 5 matches CA
 Arthur Gibson (1919) 1 match CA
 Gary Gilder (2003) 3 matches CA
 George Gill (1897–1902) 93 matches CA
 Harold Gimblett (1935–1954) 329 matches CA
 Cuthbert Godwin (1926) 2 matches CA
 Lewis Goldsworthy (2021–2022) 20 matches CA
 Brian Gomm (1939) 2 matches CA
 Edward Goodland (1908–1909) 4 matches CA
 Hugh Gore (1980) 11 matches CA
 Peter Graham (1948) 6 matches CA
 Edward Grant (1899–1901) 5 matches CA
 David Graveney (1991) 21 matches CA
 Ben Green (2018–2022) 13 matches CA
 Cleveland Greenway (1882) 1 match CA
 Leonard Greenwood (1920) 1 match CA
 Chris Greetham (1957–1966) 205 matches CA
 Thomas Gregg (1883) 1 match CA
 Lewis Gregory (2011–2022) 104 matches CA
 Ernest Greswell (1903–1910) 12 matches CA
 Bill Greswell (1908–1930) 115 matches CA
 Harry Griffin (1898–1899) 4 matches CA
 Tim Groenewald (2014–2019) 49 matches CA
 Jamie Grove (2000–2001) 14 matches CA
 Mike Groves (1965) 7 matches CA
 David Gurr (1976–1979) 24 matches CA

H 

 Edward Hack (1937) 1 match CA
 Walter Hale (1892) 8 matches CA
 Egerton Hall (1884–1885) 3 matches CA
 Geoff Hall (1961–1965) 48 matches CA
 Henry Hall (1882–1885) 2 matches CA
 Tom Hall (1953–1954) 23 matches CA
 Jeremy Hallett (1990–1995) 16 matches CA
 Montague Hambling (1920–1927) 18 matches CA
 Ralph Hancock (1907–1914) 9 matches CA
 William Hancock (1892) 1 match CA
 Michael Hanna (1951–1954) 2 matches CA
 John Harcombe (1905–1919) 7 matches CA
 Richard Harden (1985–1998) 233 matches CA
 Percy Hardy (1902–1914) 99 matches CA
 Jon Hardy (1986–1990) 87 matches CA
 Norman Hardy (1912–1921) 11 matches CA
 Mark Harman (1986–1987) 9 matches CA
 John Harris (1952–1959) 15 matches CA
 Eustace Hart (1930) 3 matches CA
 Laurie Hawkins (1928–1937) 46 matches CA
 Andy Hayhurst (1990–1996) 122 matches CA
 Richard Hayward (1985) 9 matches CA
 Esme Haywood (1925–1927) 8 matches CA
 Horace Hazell (1929–1952) 350 matches CA
 Walter Hedley (1892–1904) 84 matches CA
 John Hellard (1907–1910) 2 matches CA
 Mervyn Herbert (1903–1924) 31 matches CA
 Fred Herting (1960) 5 matches CA
 Steven Herzberg (1997) 7 matches CA
 Herbie Hewett (1884–1893) 51 matches CA
 Cecil Hickley (1898–1899) 5 matches CA
 James Hildreth (2003–2022) 277 matches CA
 Lyonel Hildyard (1882–1883) 7 matches CA
 Eric Hill (1947–1951) 72 matches CA
 Eustace Hill (1898–1901) 2 matches CA
 Evelyn Hill (1926–1929) 13 matches CA
 Francis Hill (1882) 1 match CA
 Maurice Hill (1970–1971) 22 matches CA
 Mervyn Hill (1921–1932) 42 matches CA
 Richard Hill (1882) 1 match CA
 Vernon Hill (1891–1912) 121 matches CA
 Jim Hilton (1954–1957) 71 matches CA
 Harold Hippisley (1909–1913) 7 matches CA
 Gerard Hodgkinson (1904–1911) 19 matches CA
 Piran Holloway (1994–2003) 114 matches CA
 Trevor Holmes (1969) 1 match CA
 Ernest Holt (1930) 2 matches CA
 Ernest Hood (1935) 1 match CA
 Arthur Hook (1897–1906) 2 matches CA
 John Hook (1975) 1 match CA
 Philip Hope (1914–1925) 41 matches CA
 Adam Hose (2016–2017) 4 matches CA
 Frederick Hotham (1882) 1 match CA
 Biron House (1912–1914) 3 matches CA
 David Hughes (1955) 1 match CA
 Charles Hulls (1885) 1 match CA
 Henry Humphries (1906) 1 match CA
 George Hunt (1921–1931) 233 matches CA
 George Hunt (1898) 1 match CA
 Bert Hunt (1936) 11 matches CA
 Thos Hunt (2004) 1 match CA
 Gemaal Hussain (2011–2013) 18 matches CA
 Bruce Hylton-Stewart (1912–1914) 33 matches CA
 Bill Hyman (1900–1914) 38 matches CA

I 

 Imam-ul-Haq (2022) 3 matches CA
 Reggie Ingle (1923–1939) 309 matches CA
 Colin Ingram (2014) 1 match CA
 Peter Ingram (1910) 2 matches CA
 Frank Irish (1950) 16 matches CA

J 

 John Jackson (1920) 14 matches CA
 Paul Jarvis (1999–2000) 9 matches CA
 Sanath Jayasuriya (2005) 7 matches CA
 Frederick Jennings (1895) 1 match CA
 Keith Jennings (1975–1981) 68 matches CA
 William Jewell (1884) 1 match CA
 Peter Randall Johnson (1901–1927) 229 matches CA
 Richard Johnson (2001–2006) 66 matches CA
 Allan Jones (1970–1975) 118 matches CA
 Adrian Jones (1987–1990) 88 matches CA
 Andrew Jones (1985) 3 matches CA
 Chris Jones (2010–2014) 37 matches CA
 Trevor Jones (1938–1948) 21 matches CA
 Ian Jones (1999) 3 matches CA
 James Jones (1922–1923) 17 matches CA
 Steffan Jones (1997–2009) 84 matches CA
 Frank Joy (1909–1912) 11 matches CA
 George Jupp (1901–1907) 5 matches CA

K 

 Murali Kartik (2010–2011) 19 matches CA
 Geoff Keith (1959–1961) 15 matches CA
 Wilfrid Kempe (1919) 1 match CA
 Gregor Kennis (1998–1999) 6 matches CA
 Jason Kerr (1993–2001) 58 matches CA
 Roy Kerslake (1962–1968) 52 matches CA
 Henry Kettlewell (1899) 1 match CA
 Laurence Key (1919–1922) 8 matches CA
 Khan Mohammad (1951) 1 match CA
 Craig Kieswetter (2007–2014) 105 matches CA
 Ken Kinnersley (1932–1938) 10 matches CA
 Steve Kirby (2011–2013) 35 matches CA
 Mervyn Kitchen (1960–1979) 352 matches CA
 David Kitson (1952–1954) 32 matches CA

L 

 George Lambert (1960) 3 matches CA
 Tom Lammonby (2020–2022) 33 matches CA
 George Langdale (1946–1949) 20 matches CA
 Justin Langer (2006–2009) 48 matches CA
 Charl Langeveldt (2005) 6 matches CA
 Brian Langford (1953–1974) 504 matches CA
 Aaron Laraman (2003–2005) 33 matches CA
 Mike Latham (1961–1962) 18 matches CA
 Mark Lathwell (1991–2001) 142 matches CA
 Johnny Lawrence (1946–1955) 281 matches CA
 Miles Lawrence (1959–1961) 18 matches CA
 Cecil Leach (1924–1928) 8 matches CA
 Jack Leach (2012–2022) 86 matches CA
 Edwin Leat (1908–1910) 2 matches CA
 Fred Lee (1902–1907) 77 matches CA
 Fred Lee (1925–1927) 10 matches CA
 Frank Lee (1929–1947) 328 matches CA
 Jack Lee (1925–1936) 241 matches CA
 Shane Lee (1996) 17 matches CA
 Roland Lefebvre (1990–1992) 36 matches CA
 Ned Leonard (2021–2022) 2 matches CA
 Robin Lett (2006) 3 matches CA
 Albert Lewis (1899–1914) 208 matches CA
 George Lillington (1883–1885) 2 matches CA
 Vincent Lindo (1963) 1 match CA
 Anthony Ling (1939) 5 matches CA
 Keith Linney (1931–1937) 32 matches CA
 Jeremy Lloyds (1979–1984) 100 matches CA
 Bryan Lobb (1955–1969) 115 matches CA
 Edward Lock (1891–1893) 2 matches CA
 Walter Lock (1928) 1 match CA
 Ian Lomax (1962) 6 matches CA
 Geoff Lomax (1954–1962) 211 matches CA
 Bunty Longrigg (1925–1947) 219 matches CA
 Tom Lowry (1921–1924) 46 matches CA
 Wally Luckes (1924–1949) 365 matches CA
 Charles Lyall (1911) 2 matches CA
 Dar Lyon (1920–1938) 123 matches CA

M 

 Jack MacBryan (1911–1931) 156 matches CA
 Colin McCool (1956–1960) 138 matches CA
 Russ McCool (1982) 1 match CA
 Harry MacDonald (1896) 1 match CA
 Alastair MacDonald Watson (1932–1933) 4 matches CA
 Stuart MacGill (1997) 1 match CA
 Neil McKenzie (2007) 3 matches CA
 Douglas McLean (1896) 1 match CA
 Nixon McLean (2003–2005) 33 matches CA
 Ken MacLeay (1991–1992) 27 matches CA
 John McMahon (1954–1957) 115 matches CA
 Peter McRae (1936–1939) 25 matches CA
 John Madden-Gaskell (1928–1930) 9 matches CA
 Sajid Mahmood (2012) 3 matches CA
 Saqib Mahmood (1999) 1 match CA
 Vivian Majendie (1907–1910) 2 matches CA
 Lionel Major (1903) 1 match CA
 Neil Mallender (1987–1994) 118 matches CA
 Fred Marks (1884) 1 match CA
 Vic Marks (1975–1989) 275 matches CA
 Edward Marsh (1885) 2 matches CA
 Reginald Marsh (1928–1934) 4 matches CA
 Alan Marshall (1914–1931) 45 matches CA
 Leslie Marshall (1913–1931) 11 matches CA
 John Martin (1964–1965) 2 matches CA
 Henry Martyn (1901–1908) 74 matches CA
 William Massey (1882) 1 match CA
 James Maxwell (1906–1908) 10 matches CA
 Charles Mayo (1928) 6 matches CA
 Ajantha Mendis (2011) 2 matches CA
 Patrick Mermagen (1930) 8 matches CA
 Craig Meschede (2011–2014) 28 matches CA
 Jack Meyer (1936–1949) 65 matches CA
 George Mirehouse (1884–1885) 4 matches CA
 Colin Mitchell (1952–1954) 30 matches CA
 Mandy Mitchell-Innes (1931–1949) 69 matches CA
 John Mitton (1920) 2 matches CA
 Paul Molyneux (1937) 6 matches CA
 Hugh Montgomery (1901–1909) 12 matches CA
 Bill Montgomery (1905–1907) 10 matches CA
 Osbert Mordaunt (1905–1910) 14 matches CA
 Bert Morgan (1909–1910) 6 matches CA
 John Morrison (1920) 1 match CA
 Hallam Moseley (1971–1982) 205 matches CA
 Michael Munday (2005–2010) 16 matches CA
 Marwood Munden (1908) 3 matches CA
 Ernest Murdock (1885) 2 matches CA
 Mushtaq Ahmed (1993–1998) 62 matches CA
 Johann Myburgh (2014–2016) 28 matches CA

N 

 Kumar Narayan (1909–1910) 4 matches CA
 George Newport (1902–1904) 2 matches CA
 Arthur Newton (1891–1914) 197 matches CA
 Stephen Newton (1882–1884) 16 matches CA
 George Nichols (1891–1899) 134 matches CA
 Albert North (1903–1909) 15 matches CA
 Edward Northway (1925–1926) 8 matches CA
 Reginald Northway (1929–1933) 17 matches CA

O 

 Geoffrey Ogilvy (1936) 2 matches CA
 Kerry O'Keeffe (1971–1972) 46 matches CA
 Martin Olive (1977–1981) 17 matches CA
 Richard Ollis (1981–1985) 37 matches CA
 Craig Overton (2012–2022) 104 matches CA
 Jamie Overton (2012–2020) 64 matches CA

P 

 Edward Page (1885) 1 match CA
 Lionel Palairet (1891–1909) 222 matches CA
 Richard Palairet (1891–1902) 85 matches CA
 Gary Palmer (1982–1988) 54 matches CA
 Ken Palmer (1955–1969) 302 matches CA
 Roy Palmer (1965–1970) 74 matches CA
 Arthur Pape (1912) 1 match CA
 James Parfitt (1883–1885) 6 matches CA
 Jim Parks, Jr. (1973–1976) 47 matches CA
 Keith Parsons (1992–2006) 130 matches CA
 Michael Parsons (2005) 2 matches CA
 Arthur Paterson (1903) 2 matches CA
 Edmund Paul (1907–1910) 4 matches CA
 Richard Paull (1963–1964) 6 matches CA
 Andrew Payne (1992–1994) 4 matches CA
 George Peake (1885) 1 match CA
 Allan Pearse (1936–1938) 9 matches CA
 Tony Pearson (1961–1963) 6 matches CA
 Anthony Pelham (1933) 2 matches CA
 Horace Perry (1927) 1 match CA
 Richard Peters (1946) 1 match CA
 Alviro Petersen (2013–2014) 17 matches CA
 Vernon Philander (2012) 5 matches CA
 Ben Phillips (2008–2010) 28 matches CA
 Frank Phillips (1897–1911) 67 matches CA
 Lewis Pickles (1955–1958) 47 matches CA
 Adrian Pierson (1998–2000) 32 matches CA
 Dudley Pontifex (1882) 1 match CA
 Ricky Ponting (2004) 3 matches CA
 Nigel Popplewell (1979–1985) 118 matches CA
 Robert Porch (1895–1910) 27 matches CA
 Albert Porter (1883) 2 matches CA
 Francis Portman (1897–1899) 2 matches CA
 Frederick Potbury (1882) 1 match CA
 Louis Powell (1927–1938) 10 matches CA
 Frederick Poynton (1891–1896) 25 matches CA
 Massey Poyntz (1905–1919) 102 matches CA
 Hugh Poyntz (1904–1921) 37 matches CA
 Frederick Pratten (1930–1931) 12 matches CA
 Bill Price (1901) 1 match CA
 James Priddy (1933–1939) 7 matches CA
 Nick Pringle (1986–1991) 27 matches CA
 Harry Pruett (1921–1926) 2 matches CA

R 

 Octavius Radcliffe (1885) 5 matches CA
 Robert Ramsay (1882) 4 matches CA
 Jim Redman (1948–1953) 65 matches CA
 Francis Reed (1882–1884) 10 matches CA
 Farrant Reed (1882–1885) 7 matches CA
 James Regan (2012) 1 match CA
 Matt Renshaw (2018–2022) 14 matches CA
 James Rew (2022) 7 matches CA
 Viv Richards (1974–1986) 191 matches CA
 Alfred Richardson (1895) 1 match CA
 Tom Richardson (1905) 1 match CA
 Arthur Ricketts (1936) 1 match CA
 Dudley Rippon (1914–1920) 31 matches CA
 Sydney Rippon (1914–1937) 102 matches CA
 Frederick Roberts (1899) 1 match CA
 John Roberts (1969–1970) 8 matches CA
 Raymond Robertson-Glasgow (1920–1935) 77 matches CA
 Crescens Robinson (1885–1896) 31 matches CA
 Ellis Robinson (1950–1952) 89 matches CA
 Peter Robinson (1965–1977) 180 matches CA
 Ray Robinson (1964) 1 match CA
 Theodore Robinson (1884–1894) 10 matches CA
 Ernie Robson (1895–1923) 424 matches CA
 Brian Roe (1957–1966) 131 matches CA
 Bill Roe (1882–1899) 66 matches CA
 Peter Roebuck (1974–1991) 306 matches CA
 Chris Rogers (2016) 16 matches CA
 Stuart Rogers (1948–1953) 118 matches CA
 Luke Ronchi (2015) 4 matches CA
 Brian Rose (1969–1987) 251 matches CA
 Graham Rose (1987–2002) 244 matches CA
 Hamilton Ross (1883–1891) 5 matches CA
 Tim Rouse (2016–2017) 4 matches CA
 George Rowdon (1936) 1 match CA
 Fred Rumsey (1963–1968) 153 matches CA
 Neil Russom (1980–1983) 4 matches CA

S 

 Edward Sainsbury (1882–1885) 25 matches CA
 John Sainsbury (1951) 2 matches CA
 Sajid Khan (2022) 4 matches CA
 Oswald Samson (1900–1913) 45 matches CA
 Arthur Sanders (1919) 1 match CA
 Henry Saunders (1911–1922) 4 matches CA
 Donald Scott (1936) 1 match CA
 Henry Scott (1882) 2 matches CA
 Tim Scriven (1988–1989) 3 matches CA
 Jake Seamer (1932–1948) 59 matches CA
 Arthur Sellick (1905) 6 matches CA
 Richard Selwyn Payne (1906) 1 match CA
 Kevin Shine (1996–1998) 33 matches CA
 Alan Shirreff (1958) 2 matches CA
 Shoaib Akhtar (2001) 1 match CA
 Ernest Shorrocks (1905) 1 match CA
 Walter Shuldham (1914–1924) 6 matches CA
 Peter Siddle (2022) 8 matches CA
 Dennis Silk (1956–1960) 33 matches CA
 Richard Sladdin (1997) 1 match CA
 Phil Slocombe (1975–1983) 135 matches CA
 William Sloman (1895–1896) 4 matches CA
 Douglas Smith (1896–1898) 21 matches CA
 Frederick Smith (1884–1885) 3 matches CA
 Graeme Smith (2005) 4 matches CA
 Roy Smith (1949–1955) 96 matches CA
 William Smith (1895–1898) 6 matches CA
 Richard Snell (1992) 16 matches CA
 Steve Snell (2011–2012) 3 matches CA
 Richard Southcombe (1936–1937) 2 matches CA
 Albert Southwood (1911–1913) 3 matches CA
 Thomas Spencer (1891–1893) 3 matches CA
 Trevor Spring (1909–1910) 8 matches CA
 Edward Spurway (1885–1898) 2 matches CA
 Francis Spurway (1920–1929) 23 matches CA
 Michael Spurway (1929) 3 matches CA
 Robert Spurway (1893–1898) 16 matches CA
 Sam Spurway (2006–2007) 6 matches CA
 Richard Stanbury (1935–1936) 2 matches CA
 Edward Stanley (1884) 1 match CA
 Henry Stanley (1894–1899) 50 matches CA
 John Stenton (1953) 1 match CA
 Harold Stephenson (1948–1964) 427 matches CA
 David Stiff (2009–2010) 12 matches CA
 Andrew Strauss (2011) 1 match CA
 Montague Sturt (1896–1910) 10 matches CA
 Haydn Sully (1959–1963) 12 matches CA
 Arul Suppiah (2002–2012) 94 matches CA
 Andy Sutton (2012) 1 match CA
 Leonard Sutton (1909–1912) 17 matches CA
 Luke Sutton (1997–1998) 3 matches CA
 Tony Sutton (1948) 1 match CA
 Ian Swallow (1990–1991) 27 matches CA
 Harry Swayne (1894) 1 match CA
 Charles Sweet (1882–1883) 5 matches CA

T 

 Ernest Tandy (1904–1905) 2 matches CA
 Hugh Tapsfield (1892) 1 match CA
 Harry Tate (1882) 1 match CA
 Walter Tate (1882) 1 match CA
 Chris Tavare (1989–1993) 102 matches CA
 Charles Taylor (1910–1911) 18 matches CA
 Derek Taylor (1970–1982) 280 matches CA
 Nick Taylor (1986) 16 matches CA
 Francis Terry (1882–1885) 10 matches CA
 Alfonso Thomas (2008–2015) 92 matches CA
 John Thomas (1901–1905) 3 matches CA
 Wyndham Thomas (1928) 1 match CA
 Alpin Thomson (1922–1923) 2 matches CA
 Elliot Tillard (1912) 9 matches CA
 Montagu Toller (1897) 6 matches CA
 Gerry Tordoff (1950–1955) 54 matches CA
 Gareth Townsend (1990–1992) 12 matches CA
 John Trask (1884–1895) 9 matches CA
 William Trask (1882–1900) 47 matches CA
 Peter Trego (2000–2018) 200 matches CA
 Maurice Tremlett (1947–1960) 353 matches CA
 Marcus Trescothick (1993–2019) 296 matches CA
 Alfred Trestrail (1905) 1 match CA
 Graham Tripp (1955–1959) 34 matches CA
 Benjamin Trott (1997–1998) 3 matches CA
 Harvey Trump (1988–1996) 106 matches CA
 Joseph Tucker (2000–2001) 2 matches CA
 Hervey Tudway (1910) 1 match CA
 Mark Turner (2007–2009) 6 matches CA
 Murray Turner (1984–1986) 12 matches CA
 Robert Turner (1991–2005) 211 matches CA
 Simon Turner (1984–1985) 6 matches CA
 Ted Tyler (1891–1907) 177 matches CA

U 

 Andrew Umeed (2022) 1 match CA
 Paul Unwin (1989) 1 match CA

V 

 Roelof van der Merwe (2016–2022) 28 matches CA
 Paul van Meekeren (2016–2018) 3 matches CA
 Andre van Troost (1991–1998) 67 matches CA
 Percy Vasey (1913) 1 match CA
 Gilbert Vassall (1902–1905) 6 matches CA
 Tony Vickery (1947–1948) 6 matches CA
 Murali Vijay (2019) 3 matches CA
 Amar Virdi (2022) 1 match CA
 Roy Virgin (1957–1972) 321 matches CA

W 

 Frederic Waldock (1920–1924) 17 matches CA
 Micky Walford (1946–1953) 52 matches CA
 Malcolm Walker (1952–1958) 29 matches CA
 Max Waller (2009–2018) 9 matches CA
 Lancelot Ward (1913–1920) 3 matches CA
 John Watson (1933–1936) 19 matches CA
 Hugh Watts (1939–1952) 61 matches CA
 Steve Waugh (1987–1988) 19 matches CA
 Sam Weaver (1939) 2 matches CA
 Thomas Webley (2003) 6 matches CA
 Arthur Wellard (1927–1950) 391 matches CA
 Fred Welman (1882–1901) 19 matches CA
 Albert Westcott (1894–1902) 6 matches CA
 Edward Western (1882–1884) 2 matches CA
 Louis Wharton (1921–1922) 11 matches CA
 Ellis Whately (1904) 1 match CA
 Heneage Wheeler (1904) 1 match CA
 Cameron White (2006–2007) 24 matches CA
 Giles White (1991) 1 match CA
 Jack White (1909–1937) 409 matches CA
 Alan Whitehead (1957–1961) 38 matches CA
 Walter Whiting (1921–1923) 8 matches CA
 Albert Whittle (1907–1911) 29 matches CA
 Archie Wickham (1891–1907) 82 matches CA
 Peter Wight (1953–1965) 321 matches CA
 Walter Wilde (1929) 7 matches CA
 Donald Wilkins (1927) 2 matches CA
 Steve Wilkinson (1972–1974) 18 matches CA
 Terry Willetts (1964–1967) 16 matches CA
 Lloyd Williams (1955) 3 matches CA
 Charl Willoughby (2006–2011) 95 matches CA
 Hugh Wilson (1983–1984) 15 matches CA
 Raymond Windsor (1969) 1 match CA
 Charles Winter (1921–1925) 26 matches CA
 Charles Winter (1882–1895) 25 matches CA
 Harry Winter (1884) 1 match CA
 John Winter (1884) 1 match CA
 George Wood (1893–1894) 3 matches CA
 Henry Wood (1904) 1 match CA
 Matthew Wood (2001–2007) 75 matches CA
 Thomas Wood (1894) 1 match CA
 George Woodcock (1921) 1 match CA
 George Woodhouse (1946–1953) 58 matches CA
 Robert Woodman (2005) 3 matches CA
 Sammy Woods (1891–1910) 299 matches CA
 Bob Woolston (1987) 1 match CA
 Damien Wright (2010) 5 matches CA
 Oswald Wright (1902) 1 match CA
 Julian Wyatt (1983–1989) 69 matches CA

Y 

 Yawar Saeed (1953–1955) 50 matches CA
 Tom Young (1911–1933) 310 matches CA
 Wilfrid Young (1891–1893) 2 matches CA

List A cricketers 

The following have not played first-class cricket for Somerset but have played at least one match for Somerset in a List A match.

 Sonny Baker (2021–2022) CA
 Len Beel (1969) CA
 George Drissell (2021) CA
 Neil Hancock (2004) CA
 Jack Harding (2022) CA
 Mahela Jayawardene (2016) CA
 Robert Mutch (2012) CA
 Alfie Ogborne (2022) CA
 Kevin Parsons (1992–1993) CA
 Dermot Reeve (1998) CA
 Perry Rendell (1990) CA
 Ollie Sale (2022) CA
 George Scott (2022) CA
 Royston Sully (1985) CA
 George Thomas (2021) CA
 Josh Thomas (2022) CA
 Sam Young (2021) CA

Twenty20 cricketers

References

Bibliography

External links 
 Somerset County Cricket Club Official Site

 
Players